The 2014 Boodles Challenge was an exhibition tournament held before Wimbledon to serve as a warm-up to players. Taking place from 17 to 21 June 2014 at Stoke Park in London, it was the 13th edition of the Boodles Challenge. Robin Haase won the title.

Participants
On 23 May, the tournament organisers announced a list of 10 players that would participate in the tournament:

  Kevin Anderson
  Marin Čilić
  Novak Djokovic
  Fabio Fognini
  Ernests Gulbis
  Tommy Haas
  Robin Haase
  Jerzy Janowicz
  Milos Raonic
  Jack Sock

Results

Day 1 (17 June)

Day 2 (18 June)

Day 3 (19 June)

1Djokovic withdrew from the match to prevent further injury to his right wrist, in order to be able to compete at the 2014 Wimbledon Championships.

Day 4 (20 June)

Day 5 (21 June)

References

Boodles Challenge
Boodles Challenge
Boodles Challenge
Boodles Challenge
Boodles Challenge